Ynoa is a surname. Notable people with the surname include:

Gabriel Ynoa (born 1993), Dominican baseball player
Huascar Ynoa (born 1998), Dominican baseball player, brother of Michael
Michael Ynoa (born 1991), Dominican baseball player
Rafael Ynoa (born 1987), Dominican baseball player